The Port of Porto Alegre is an inland port located in Guaíba Lake in Porto Alegre, Rio Grande do Sul, Brazil. It is connected to Downtown Porto Alegre. Superintendência de Portos e Hidrovias (SPH) was established to manage and distribute cargoes throughout the State of Rio Grande do Sul. To assure effective operations, SPH seeks to provide modern infrastructure and technological support to the Port of Porto Alegre.

References

Ports and harbours of Brazil
Porto Alegre